Counting Down is the second studio album by Australian boy band and pop vocal group Human Nature, released on 14 May 1999.

Track listing 
"Last to Know" (Steve Kipner, Sean Hosein, Dane DeViller) – 4:26
"Cruel" (Andrew Klippel, Shep Solomon) – 5:16
"Mary's Garden" (Andrew Tierney, Klippel, Michael Tierney) – 4:00
"Counting Down" (Tierney, Klippel, Tierney) – 3:24
"Don't Cry" (U.S. Radio Remix) (Klippel, Glass) – 3:59
"Depend on Me" (Tierney, Paul Begaud, Tierney) – 4:42
"Be There With You" (Tierney, Paul Begaud, Tierney) – 3:50
"Bring Her Back" (Klippel, Werfel, Reswick) – 4:45
"Send It in a Letter" (Klippel, Tierney, Toby Allen, Phil Burton, Tierney, Glass) – 3:58
"7 Lonely Days" (Tierney, George Merril, Tierney) – 3:54 	
"Now That I Found You" (Paul Begaud, Vanessa Corish, JD Martin) – 3:28
"Temperature Rising" (Klippel, Glass) – 4:29
"Everytime You Cry" (with John Farnham) (Peiken, Sutton) – 4:45
"Eternal Flame" (Susanna Hoffs, Tom Kelly, Billy Steinberg) – 3:20 / "We Can Fly Away" (hidden track) (Burton, G. Cunningham) – 3:00

Bonus disc tracks
 "Everytime You Cry"
 "Eternal Flame"
 "Last to Know" (Radio Remix)
 "Last to Know" (VV Club Remix)
 "Cruel" (Radio Remix)

Personnel
 Arrangement (additional) – Andrew Tierney (tracks: 1, 6, 7, 11), Michael Tierney (tracks: 1, 6, 7, 11), Rod Temperton (track 5)
 Arrangement (vocals) – Andrew Klippel (tracks: 1 to 5, 8 to 10, 12, 13), Human Nature (tracks: 1 to 13, 15), Phil Burton (tracks: 1 to 13, 15), Rod Temperton (track 3)
 Arrangement (strings) – Jamie Muhoberac, Larry Muhoberac (track 2)
 Design (booklet design) – Erica McIntyre
 Design (cover design) – New Moon
 Engineering (additional) – Andrew Scheps (tracks: 2, 3, 10, 12), John Paterno (tracks: 3, 5, 10, 12), Nick Brophy (track 2, 10)
 Engineering (mix) – Doug Brady (track 6)
 Guitar – Alan Kato (tracks: 3, 5, 9, 10), Peter Northcote (tracks: 1, 6, 7, 11), Shep Solomon (track 2), Christopher Bruce (track 4), Paul Begaud (track 11), Tim Pierce (track 12)
 Mastering – Vlado Meller
 Mixing – Dave Way (tracks: 1, 3, 14), David Sussman (tracks: 8 to 10, 12), Mick Guzauski (track 2, 7), Carmen Rizzo (track 4), David Hemming (track 11), Paul Begaud (track 11)
 Photography – Tony Duran
 Producer – Andrew Klippel (tracks: 2 to 5, 8 to 10, 12, 14), Paul Begaud (tracks: 1, 6, 7, 11)
 Producer (additional vocals) – Andrew Tierney, George Merrill, Michael Tierney (track 10)  
 Programming – Andrew Klippel (tracks: 2 to 5, 8 to 10, 12), Paul Begaud (tracks: 1, 6, 7, 11)
 Programming (additional) – Dane DeViller, Sean Hosein, Steve Kipner (track 1)
 Recording – David Hemming (tracks: 1, 6, 7, 11, 14) 
 Recording (vocals) – David Hemming (tracks: 2, 3, 5, 9, 10, 12), Arabella Rodriguez (track 4, 8)
 Synthesizer (additional) – Jamie Muhoberac (tracks: 2 to 5)
 Talkbox effects – Cameron Hanly
 Additional drums – Damien Wagner
 Additional drum programming and mixing – Angela Piva (track 5)
 "Everytime You Cry" 
 Assistant engineer – Aaron Humphries
 Producer – John Farnham, Ross Fraser
 Producer [Human Nature vocals] – Andrew Klippel
 Mixing – Doug Brady
 Vocals – John Farnham
 Vocal engineer – Arabella Rodriguez
 Assistant vocal engineer – Richard Woodcraft
 "We Can Fly Away"
Recording – Vince Pizzinga
Piano – Phil Burton
Mixing – Doug Brady
Producer – Human Nature

Charts

Weekly charts

Year-end chart

Certifications

References

1999 albums
Human Nature (band) albums